Buffs Road Cemetery is a Commonwealth War Graves Commission burial ground for the dead of the First World War located near Ypres (Dutch: Ieper) in Belgium on the Western Front.

The cemetery grounds were assigned to the United Kingdom in perpetuity by King Albert I of Belgium in recognition of the sacrifices made by the British Empire in the defence and liberation of Belgium during the war.

Foundation

The cemetery, named after the nickname of a nearby small lane, was founded in July 1917 by the 12th, 13th and 14th Royal Sussex Regiment and the Royal Artillery. After the armistice, the cemetery was enlarged by concentrating battlefield graves and that of one officer buried in Brielen Churchyard in 1915, whilst one Belgian soldier was removed.

The cemetery was designed by A J S Hutton.

References

External links
 
 

Commonwealth War Graves Commission cemeteries in Belgium
Cemeteries and memorials in West Flanders